Chrysactinia luzmariae is a Mexican species of flowering plants in the family Asteraceae. It is native to north-central Mexico, in the state of Guanajuato.

Chrysactinia luzmariae is a shrub up to 50 cm (20 inches) tall. Leaves are pinnately lobed with a sharp point at the tip. Flower heads have yellow ray flowers and yellow disc flowers. The species grows in brushy chaparral regions.

References

Flora of Guanajuato
Tageteae
Plants described in 1998